The 2016 IIHF U18 World Championship Division II was a pair of international under-18 ice hockey tournaments organised by the International Ice Hockey Federation. The Division II A and Division II B tournaments represent the fourth and the fifth tier of the IIHF World U18 Championship.

Division II A

The Division II A tournament was played in Brasov, Romania, from April 4 to 10, 2016.

Division II B

The Division II B tournament was played in Valdemoro, Spain, from March 26 to April 1, 2016.

References

IIHF World U18 Championship Division II
2016 IIHF World U18 Championships
2016
2016
March 2016 sports events in Europe
April 2016 sports events in Europe
Sport in Brașov
Sport in the Community of Madrid